Apollo Revisited is a live album by The Stranglers.

In 2003, two versions of a gig recorded at the Glasgow Apollo appeared. This gig took place on Monday 23 November 1981 and was part of the UK tour to promote their new album La Folie. This gig was originally recorded for, and aired on, Radio Clyde in late December 1981. 

Live at the Apollo is an officially remastered version. The second version, Apollo Revisited contains audio which appears to be from the original master tapes, but includes "Who Wants the World", "Nuclear Device", "Genetix" and "The Raven".

Track listing 
 "Waltz in Black"
 "Non Stop"
 "Threatened"
 "Just Like Nothing on Earth"
 "Second Coming"
 "The Man They Love to Hate"
 "The Meninblack"
 "Golden Brown"
 "Tank"
 "Bring on the Nubiles"
 "Duchess"
 "Let Me Introduce You to the Family"
 "Hanging Around"

External links
 Apollo Revisited on Discogs

2003 live albums
The Stranglers live albums